The Yopy was the name of a series of Personal Digital Assistants (PDA) made by GMate Corporation, also used as a popular PDA Phone in Korea and based on the Linux operating system. The Linux Documentation Project considers the Yopy series to be "true Linux PDAs" because their manufacturers install Linux-based operating systems on them by default.

Overview 

At the CeBIT 2000, GMate introduced the YDK1000, the Yopy Development Kit. Without a physical keyboard this device looked very different from later versions. It came with an embedded Linux operating system and the W Window System. Later also precompiled versions of the X Window System and the IceWM window manager became available.

The first official model in the Yopy line of PDAs was the YP3000. It introduced the clam shell design with a full-Qwerty keyboard, and featured a 3.5 inch TFT screen. It also came with the X Window System and IceWM.

One of the features of the YP3500 is a CDMA module, so it can be used as a mobile phone.  In 2003, Wi-Fi was widely used in Korea, and so the YP3700 targeted this environment with an additional Wi-Fi module.

By March 2005 Gmate had stopped producing and selling the Yopy PDA and closed down its official web sites.

Yopy models 

 YDK1000, the Yopy Development Kit
 YP3000, the first official model of the Yopy
 YP3500, CDMA module was added in YP3500
 YP3700, Wi-Fi module was added in YP3700

Yopy software 

Because it used the Linux operating system, the Yopy was capable of running a variety of open source software.

References

External links 
 Official Yopy site (offline)
 Yopy User Group (in Korean)
 The unofficial YopyWiki, find and share information about Yopy PDAs
 UK Based Re-seller for Europe (offline)
 UK Based Yopy User Group
 Gmate Yopy PDA review (offline)
 Mac OS X USB driver for Zaurus and Yopy
 Yopytheque: Yopy FAQs and how-tos in French @ Tuxmedia.com (offline)

Personal digital assistants
Linux-based devices
Embedded Linux